The Nikon D5500 is an F-mount DSLR released by Nikon on January 5, 2015.  As the successor of the D5300 (the D5400 does not exist), it is the first Nikon DSLR to feature a touchscreen.

The Nikon D5500 features a carbon-fiber composite body, weighs 60 grams less than it’s predecessor (the D5300), and has a touchscreen as well as Wi-Fi. It lacks NFC (near field communication) connectivity and GPS functionality.

A review lists the bigger buffer for raw files and the longer battery life.

The D5500 was superseded by the D5600 in late 2016.

Features

 24.2MP CMOS sensor with no optical low-pass filter
 Ultra-compact and lightweight body
 Multi-CAM 4800DX 39-point autofocus system
 2,016-pixel RGB metering sensor, used for 3D subject tracking in AF-C
 Sensitivity range of ISO 100–25,600
 5 fps continuous shooting
 1/4000 sec maximum shutter speed
 3.2", 1.2M dot fully articulating touchscreen LCD display
 1080/60p video with clean output over HDMI and Flat Picture Control
 Built-in Wi-Fi

See also
 List of Nikon F-mount lenses with integrated autofocus motor

References

External links

 Nikon D5500, Nikon USA
 Nikon D5500, Nikon Global
 Nikon D5500 reviews at Digital Photography Review

D5500
D5500
Live-preview digital cameras
Cameras introduced in 2015